Kissing station is a railway station in the municipality of Kissing, located in the Aichach-Friedberg district in Bavaria, Germany.

References

Railway stations in Bavaria
Buildings and structures in Aichach-Friedberg